Angamoozhy is a village in Pathanamthitta district in the Indian state of Kerala.
Angamoozhy is located near the Kakkad power station and the Sabarimala temple.
Geographically Angamoozhy is High-range area.

Economy
Angamoozhy is mainly a plantation township. Earlier famed for tea/coffee plantations, nowadays swaying rubber trees have replaced them, fuelled by the fertile land and rich ecosystem. In addition to rubber cultivation, pineapple, tapioca, nuts, ginger, and pepper are cultivated

Transportation
Both state run KSRTC and private operated buses connect Angamoozhy to Pathanamthitta town. Angamoozhy is located on Mannarakulanji-Moozhiyar Road. Pilgrims to the famous Sabarimala temple return by road (as one way) through Angamoozhy via Plappally. This road joins with the one way road to Sabarimala at Vadaserikara.

Geography
Angamoozhy is geographically a high-range area (Malanadu) situated in the south eastern part of Kerala and very close to the Western ghats mountain ranges.

Administration
Angamoozhy is located in Seethathodu Panchayat and is included in the Konni taluk in Pathanamthitta District. It is located 45.7 km away from Pathanamthitta town at its east. Nearby Panchayats are Chittar, Perunad, Vadaserikkara and Konni. Formerly Angamoozhy was included in the Ranni legislative assembly constituent, but now in Konni assembly. Angamoozhy was previously located in the Idukki parliamentary constituency, and is currently in Pathanamthitta

Landmark

The famous Nilackal St. Thomas Church is situated near Angamoozhy. The second largest hydroelectric project in Kerala, Sabarigiri, is located in this village.

Location
Angamoozhy is on the Pathanamthitta - kumily Route. A small river, Kakkattar (Tributary of the Pamba River), marks the centre of Angamoozhy town. which is exactly 3 km from Seethathodu.

Etymology
Angamoozhy is a historic town with references back to at least the 19th century. The name Angamoozhy derives from Anamoozhy, which is the name of the junction, visited by the elephants at the center of the town. In Malayalam, Ana means elephant and Moozhy is town.

Climate 

The city has a tropical climate, the monsoons start in June. The months of April–May can get pretty humid. The best weather is from October to February.

Angamoozhy experiences three distinct seasons: summer, monsoon and winter.  Typical summer months are from March to May.  The warmest month in Angamoozhy is April. Although summer doesn't end until May, the city often receives locally developed heavy thundershowers in May (although humidity remains high).

Winter begins in December. December through February are the winter months. The lowest temperatures are experienced during January.

Angamoozhy is the gateway to the world-renowned pilgrim centre Sabarimala. The area also has a few beautiful dams and adjoining man made reservoirs.

Population
The people of Angamoozhy are mainly agriculturists and plantation workers. People began settling down in Angamoozhy about 100 years ago. The people mainly belong to Hindu, Christian and Muslim religions. There are several places of religious worship in Angamoozhy. In many of the families based in Angamoozhy, there are large numbers of people working outside Kerala as well as outside India.

Agriculture

Agriculture is the main occupation. About 75% of the population are dependent on this sector. The hilly terrain coupled with high humidity makes the region suitable for rubber plantations. Tapioca and pulses are the important dry land crops. Other major crops are coconut, banana, pepper and ginger. In certain areas cashew, pineapple, sugarcane, cocoa and other tree spices are cultivated.

Political
Communist parties have a strong base in Angamoozhy. The Communist Party of India (Marxist)-led Left Democratic Front (LDF) governs both panchayat wards in Angamoozhy and the Seethathodu Panchayat is controlled by the LDF.

Despite of having a strong communist base, both the Member of Parliament and the Member of State Legislative Assembly representing the area from Indian National Congress, the main political opponent of the left parties.

Temples

Angamoozhy is the gateway to Sabarimala. One of the important temples at Angamoozhy is Sree Shakthi Dharma Shastha Temple, dedicated to Lord Ayyappa. This temple is an example of the Kerala style of architecture. The main deity is Devi and Sastha. Shiva, Ganapathy and Nagaraja are other sub deities. The Utsavam is celebrating in grand style. During Sabarimala season the pilgrims are given food free of cost.

Chayalppadi Church

One of the first members the Kurisumala Ashram, Vagamon, Fr. Nadamala Philipose, arrived at Angamoozhy on 2 April 1972. It was an underdeveloped region situated between two major pilgrim centers of Kerala, namely Sabarimala (Hindu) and Nilackal (Christian). With the blessing of Archbishop Benedict Mar Gregorios, the Metropolitan of Trivandrum, Fr. Nadamala, clothed in saffron tunice reached this mission centre. With the intention of the renewal of the Nilackal church (one of the seven churches established by St. Thomas, the Apostle) Fr. Nadamala started residing in this forest area, where there were many wild animals. Along with this mission, he was also involved in the social development activities of the locality. When he reached the place, there was only a small chapel made of grass belonging to the Archdiocese of Trivandrum. But the people of the location, including Hindus, Christians and Muslims jointly built a hut thatched with grass for him to reside. He gave the name to his new hut, 'Chayalpadi' which means 'entrance (Padi) to Nilakkal (Chayal)'.
Father Nadamala passed away on May 21

Education
Important schools:
 Mountzion U.P.S (formerly Gurkulam U.P.S) Angamoozhy
 S.A.V.H.S Angamoozhy
 Cherupushpam Eng. Medium School Angamoozhy
 K.R.P.M H.S.S Seethathodu
 Govt. H. S. S, Chittar
 Govt. Model L. P. S., Chittar
 V. K. N. M. V. H. S. S, Vayyattupuzha
 Holy Family Public School, Chittar
 Komala Vilasm School, Padayanippara
 Little Angels English Medium School Chittar
 Royal Parallel College, Chittar
 Santhi Niketan Parallel College, Chittar
 Ideal Parallel College, Chittar
Nearby Colleges:
 SNDP College, Chittar
 Musaliar College of Arts and Science, Pathanamthitta
 SAS SNDP Yogam College, Konni
 NSS College, Konni
 Caarmel Engineering College, R-Perunad
 Musalliar Engineering College, Malayalappuzha
 Mount Zion Engineering College, Kadammanitta
 Pushpagiri Medical College, Tiruvalla
 Muthoot Nursing College, Pathanamthitta
 St. Thomas College, Ranni
 Catholicate College, Pathanamthitta
 Mar Ivanios ITC, Seethathodu

Transportation
Airports : Thiruvananthapuram's Thiruvananthapuram International Airport and kochi's Cochin International Airport s are at almost the same distance from Angamoozhy (about a three-hour drive).

Railways : The nearest railway stations are Chengannur (65 km), and Thiruvalla (69 km).

Roads :the main roads are Vadaserikara - Chittar - Angamoozhy - Plappally Road, Pathanamthitta - Angamoozhy - kumily.

Buses : All major long-route buses stop at Angamoozhy Junction.

Local Transport : Taxi's (Auto-rickshaws, Cars..etc.) are available at every road and at all major junctions they have their slots. Smaller buses ply on regular intervals to the internal locations, as there are narrow roads.

Feature films in Angamoozhy 
Some sequences of Malayalam film Captain shot in Angamoozhy. Recently, the Kunchacko Boban starred film Ordinary was shot in the surrounding area of Gavi, it is near to Angamoozhy.

Important places
 Valupara
 Aliyanmukku
 Kochandy
 Thevarmala
 Panjipara
 Kottamonpara
 Plappally
 Nilakkal
 Gavi
 Moozhiyar
 chathuppu
 Idippukal
 Kochukoickal
 Urumpini
 Poovelikkunnu
 Murukkini

Hospitals and medical stores 
 Govt. Primary health centre
 Chaithanya Hospital
 Cosmo Hospital
 Sabitha Medicals

References

Villages in Pathanamthitta district